Joanna Hausmann Jatar (born 20 March 1989) is a British–born Venezuelan actress, comedian and television writer. She gained popularity through her videos on YouTube as well as on Univision's bilingual platform, Flama. She is currently the head writer for Hamster and Gretel.

Early life
Hausmann was born in Leamington Spa, Warwickshire, England, to Ricardo Hausmann and Cuban-Venezuelan Ana Julia Jatar during their graduate studies in the UK. Her father is of German and Belgian Jewish origin while her mother has European and Lebanese origin. Her mother escaped Cuba during the Castro regime. She became a US citizen in 2012.

Career
Her digital series Joanna Rants attempts to bridge bicultural gaps and challenge stereotypes through humor. She tackles a variety of subjects such as explaining the different Spanish accents across Latin America, and comparing U.S. and Latin American customs and politics.

Hausmann was a correspondent on the Netflix series Bill Nye Saves the World, which ran from 21 April 2017 to 11 May 2018. She was called the show's "unexpected star" by Inverse Magazine. She also voices the Octalian Pilot on Disney Channel's Milo Murphy's Law. She is slated to voice another animated character on the upcoming Monsters, Inc. spin-off series from Disney, Monsters at Work. Hausmann is also a cast member on the animated Paramount+ series "Harper House.". Hausmann has written for television for shows including TruTV's sitcom Tacoma FD. She is the head-writer on Disney Channel's "Hamster & Gretel."

She won Comedian of the Year and Creator of the Year at Hispanicize's 2016 Tecla Awards and was nominated for a Best Humor Series Shorty Award. In 2018, she was honored by the National Hispanic Media Coalition with the award in Excellence in Online Story Telling.

Personal life
She is a performer at The Upright Citizens Brigade Theatre in New York City and a vocal critic of the government of Nicolás Maduro in Venezuela. She is Jewish. Her father, Ricardo Hausmann, was appointed by Juan Guaidó as envoy to the Inter-American Development Bank until his resignation in September 2019. Her brother is Michel Hausmann, a Venezuelan theater director who endured discrimination after an orchestra cancelled their collaboration with his production of Fiddler on the Roof, citing their concern for government funding under Hugo Chávez. She is also the niece of Venezuelan journalist Braulio Jatar, a former political prisoner.

References

External links

1989 births
Living people
American people of Venezuelan-Jewish descent
Converts to Judaism from Christianity
English emigrants to Venezuela
English people of Jewish descent
English people of Venezuelan descent
Jewish American female comedians
Jewish American writers
People from Leamington Spa
People of Belgian-Jewish descent
People of Venezuelan-Jewish descent
People with acquired American citizenship
Venezuelan emigrants to the United States
Venezuelan film actresses
Venezuelan Jews
Venezuelan people of Canarian descent
Venezuelan people of Cuban descent
Venezuelan people of German-Jewish descent
Venezuelan people of Italian descent
Venezuelan people of Lebanese-Jewish descent
Venezuelan people of Spanish descent
Venezuelan stage actresses
Venezuelan television actresses
Venezuelan voice actresses
Venezuelan women comedians
Venezuelan YouTubers